Indiana Yearly Meeting is a Yearly Meeting of the Religious Society of Friends, or Quakers. Indiana Yearly Meeting was established in 1821 and originally included all Friends west of the Scioto River, in Ohio, and Friends in Indiana and Illinois.

The Yearly Meeting met for most of its history in Richmond, Indiana. For much of its history, Indiana Yearly Meeting was the largest Quaker yearly meeting in the world. It "set off", or established, Western Yearly Meeting, at Plainfield, Indiana, in 1858, Iowa Yearly Meeting, at Oskaloosa, Iowa, in 1863, Kansas Yearly Meeting (now Evangelical Friends Church Mid-America Yearly Meeting), at Lawrence, Kansas, in 1872, and Wilmington Yearly Meeting, at Wilmington, Ohio, in 1891.

Indiana Yearly Meeting established the school that became Earlham College in 1847, White's Institute, first a home for Indians, then an orphanage, and later a home for delinquent youths, in 1850, Quaker Haven Camp in 1926, and Friends Fellowship Community, a retirement home in Richmond, Indiana, in 1964.

Indiana Yearly Meeting's membership has been in a downward trend since the 1910s, but average attendance at worship has remained steady. Currently, Indiana Yearly Meeting is the only North American yearly meeting in Friends United Meeting in which average reported attendance at worship exceeds membership. Indiana Yearly Meeting remains one of the key financial supporters of Friends United Meeting. The membership as reported in the 2013 minute book consists of about 2,300 persons in nearly fifty congregations.

While many Quaker yearly meetings have suffered serious divisions in their history, Indiana Yearly Meeting suffered no serious fractures and only three minor divisions during the 19th and 20th centuries. In the nineteenth century, this gave the yearly meeting a reputation for being both moderate and evangelical. As such, it was Indiana Yearly Meeting that led the call for more centralization among Orthodox Gurneyite Friends, leading to the calling of the Friends Conference of 1887 and the Richmond Declaration.

In 2013, after several years of tension over the issues of homosexuality and yearly meeting authority, Indiana Yearly Meeting released eighteen of its congregations. Fifteen of those released congregations ultimately formed the New Association of Friends.  Forty-five congregations and two Latino church plants remained in Indiana Yearly Meeting, affirming the traditional doctrinal statements of the yearly meeting and its statements on social issues, which tend to be biblically conservative and reach to the earliest days of Friends (Quakers). Indiana Yearly Meeting has also accepted congregations that formerly belonged to Western Yearly Meeting. The congregations left Western Yearly Meeting over that body's growing liberalism.

Indiana Yearly Meeting has been headquartered in Muncie, Indiana, since 1965. Paid staff consists of a general superintendent, a director of youth and camping ministries, a ministerial advocate, and clerical staff. Yearly Meeting sessions have been held at Quaker Haven Camp, near Syracuse, Indiana, for several years.

See also
Friends United Meeting
 Ohio Valley Yearly Meeting, formerly Indiana Yearly Meeting (Hicksite)

References

External links
iym.org
fum.org
 Quakermeetings.com

Quaker yearly meetings
Quakerism in the United States
Quakerism in Indiana
1821 establishments in Indiana
Recurring events established in 1821
Events in Indiana
Annual events in the United States